Rewarming shock (also known as rewarming collapse) has been described as a drop in blood pressure following the warming of a person who is very cold. The real cause of this rewarming shock is unknown.

There was a theoretical concern that external rewarming rather than internal rewarming may increase the risk. These concerns were partly believed to be due to afterdrop, a situation detected during laboratory experiments where there is a continued decrease in core temperature after rewarming has been started. Recent studies have not supported these concerns, and problems are not found with active external rewarming.

References

Medical emergencies